Adolf Goerz (born 18 December 1857 in Mainz Germany d. 28 July 1900 in Giessbach Switzerland) was a German-South African mining engineer. He emigrated to Africa around 1888. He founded Adolf Görz & Co which later became the Union Corporation, which was one of the five original gold mining houses of South Africa.

References 

1857 births
1900 deaths
Engineers from Rhineland-Palatinate
South African mining businesspeople
German mining engineers
South African mining engineers
German expatriates in South Africa
German expatriates in Switzerland
19th-century German engineers
19th-century South African engineers
Businesspeople from Mainz